This is a list of Chinese football transfers for the 2017 season winter transfer window. Super League and League One transfer windows were opened on 1 January 2017 and closed on 28 February 2017. League Two transfer window was opened on 1 March 2017 and closed on 15 March 2017.

Super League

Beijing Sinobo Guoan

In:

 
 

 
 
 
 

Out:

Changchun Yatai

In:

 
 
 
 
 
 
 
 

Out:

Chongqing Dangdai Lifan

In:

 

 

 

 
 

Out:

Guangzhou Evergrande Taobao

In:

 
 

Out:

Guangzhou R&F

In:

 
 
 
 

 

Out:

Guizhou Hengfeng Zhicheng

In:

 
 
 
 
 
 
 
 
 
 
 
 
 

Out:

Hebei China Fortune

In:

 
 
  
 
 
 
 
 
 
 

 

Out:

Henan Jianye

In:

 
 
 
 
 
 
 
 
 
 

Out:

Jiangsu Suning

In:

 
 
 
 
 
 

 

Out:

Liaoning FC

In:

 
 
 
 
 
 
 
 

 

Out:

Shandong Luneng Taishan

In:

 
 

 

Out:

Shanghai Greenland Shenhua

In:

 
 
 
 
 

 

 

Out:

Shanghai SIPG

In:

 
 
 
 
 
 
 

Out:

Tianjin Quanjian

In:

 

 
 
 
 
 
 

Out:

Tianjin Teda

In:

 
 
 
 
 
 

 
 
 
 
 
 
 
 

Out:

Yanbian Funde

In:

 
 
 
 
 
 
 

Out:

League One

Baoding Yingli ETS

In:

 
 

 
 

 

Out:

Beijing BG

In:

 

 
 
 
 
 

 

Out:

Beijing Renhe

In:

 
 
 
 
 
 
 
 

 

 

Out:

Dalian Transcendence

In:

 
 
 
 
 
 
 
 

Out:

Dalian Yifang

In:

 
 

 
 

Out:

Hangzhou Greentown

In:

 
 
 

Out:

Meizhou Hakka

In:

 

 

 

Out:

Nei Mongol Zhongyou

In:

 

 
 

Out:

Qingdao Huanghai

In:

 
 
 
 
 

 

 

Out:

Shanghai Shenxin

In:

 
 
 
 
 
 

Out:

Shenzhen F.C.

In:

 
 
 
 
 
 
 

 
 

Out:

Shijiazhuang Ever Bright

In:

 
 
 
 

 

 

Out:

Wuhan Zall

In:

 
 
 
 
 
 
 
 
 
 
 
 
 
 

Out:

Xinjiang Tianshan Leopard

In:

 
 
 

Out:

Yunnan Lijiang

In:
 
 

 

 
 
 
 
 

Out:

Zhejiang Yiteng

In:

 

 

 
 
  
  

Out:

League Two

Withdrawal

Tianjin Huochetou

In:

Out:

References

2017
2017 in Chinese football
China